The Parliamentary Secretary to the Ministry of Health was a junior ministerial office in the United Kingdom Government.

The Ministry of Health was created in 1919 as a reconstruction of the Local Government Board. Local government functions were eventually transferred to the Minister of Housing and Local Government, leaving the Health Ministry in charge of Health proper.

From 1968 it was amalgamated with the Ministry of Social Security under the Secretary of State for Social Services, until a demerger of the Department of Health and Social Security on 25 July 1988.

The office became the Parliamentary Under-Secretary of State for Health and Social Security.

Parliamentary Secretaries to the Ministry of Health, 1919-1968

Health ministers of the United Kingdom
Defunct ministerial offices in the United Kingdom